Raymond Ian Burns (born 24 April 1954), known by the stage name Captain Sensible, is an English singer, songwriter and guitarist.

Captain Sensible co-founded the punk rock band the Damned, originally playing bass before switching to guitar. He embarked on a solo career during the 1980s, following a UK number one hit with his cover of "Happy Talk".

Captain Sensible's distinctive appearance includes a red beret and sunglasses, typically with white frames.  He was also a founder of the Blah! Party.

Early life
Captain Sensible was born in Balham, London, on 24 April 1954. He went to Stanley Technical School for Boys in South Norwood, Croydon. The first musical instrument he played was a Bontempi organ. Growing up, he listened to Brian Auger, Syd Barrett, Small Faces, Egg, Stray, Soft Machine and the Groundhogs.

The Damned
Originally a member of the Johnny Moped band, Captain Sensible joined the Damned in 1976 on the suggestion of his colleague Rat Scabies, the band's drummer, filling a number of positions during his tenure (including bassist, lead guitarist and keyboardist), and eventually becoming the band's main songwriter following the departure of Brian James.

Captain Sensible left in the 1980s to concentrate on solo projects, but rejoined in 1996 after Scabies left, and co-wrote Grave Disorder, the band's first new studio album for 8 years, in 2001. He continues to tour and record with the band.

Solo career
Captain Sensible's first solo release came in 1978 with the single "Jet Boy, Jet Girl", an Elton Motello cover recorded while the Damned were on hiatus. He followed this in 1981 with the This Is Your Captain Speaking EP on Crass Records. He signed to A&M Records and had a UK number one hit in 1982 with a cover of "Happy Talk", the Rodgers and Hammerstein song from South Pacific, featuring backing by Dolly Mixture and a band including Robyn Hitchcock on guitar. This was later sampled for British hip hop artist Dizzee Rascal's 2004 song "Dream".

Other Captain Sensible songs that became hits in the UK and Europe were "Wot", "One Christmas Catalogue" and anti-Falklands War "Glad It's All Over", which was co-written and produced by Tony Mansfield. After quitting A&M Records he continued recording for various independent labels, including Deltic Records and Humbug Records. He has also toured with his solo band Punk Floyd.

Captain Sensible's recording of "The Snooker Song" from Mike Batt's musical The Hunting of the Snark was used as the theme music for the BBC gameshow Big Break, and he also wrote and performed a song called "Brain's Theme" for the movie Skinned Deep in 2004.

Captain Sensible is also a member of Dead Men Walking, a supergroup featuring Mike Peters, Kirk Brandon (Spear of Destiny) and Slim Jim Phantom, and the Sensible Gray Cells with current Damned mate Paul Gray.

Politics

In September 2006, Captain Sensible formed a new British political party known as the Blah! Party, saying, "We believe that voting is an important part of the democratic process, and we want the Blah! Party to be the party of protest, a channel through which the people of the U.K. can vent their dissatisfaction at nonsensical everyday things, and protest against the government and the current crop of political parties."

The Blah! Party was largely modelled on the principle of direct democracy, with suggestions being made by anyone on the party website. These suggestions would then be voted on by the membership, resulting in a "rolling manifesto." The party was launched on 24 September 2006 at a conference in Manchester. Initial policies included stopping "chav culture and the idolisation of airhead celebrities like the Beckhams, Paris Hilton and Jade Goody", alongside more serious policies of opposing the Iraq War and ID cards, instead spending money on public transport, hospitals and renewable energy.

The Blah! Party entered into a sponsorship deal with Seabrook Crisps in September 2006, with the party logo and details on joining for free printed on their packets. The party also received non-financial support from PR company Propaganda. The party received £168,309 in the last quarter of 2006. The party was debt-free in 2008, with a membership of 8,544, up from 5,000 in 2007.

The first Blah! Party candidate was Carl Finlan, who stood in the 2007 local elections in Thornton and Allerton ward, Bradford. He gained 69 votes (1.6%). Deputy leader Melodie Staniforth stood in the Holme Valley North ward of Kirklees as 'Boney Maroney' in 2008. She gained 38 votes (0.68%). She resigned shortly afterwards.

On 11 September 2007, Propaganda handed total control of the Blah! Party to Captain Sensible, former Official Monster Raving Loony Party deputy leader Melodie Staniforth, Robert Staniforth, Sadie Ingoldby, Shaun Nightingale and Gary Spate. In December 2008, Propaganda closed the website. The party ended its association with Propaganda and Seabrook, launching a new website. At the same time it de-registered from the register of political parties, deciding to instead be a protest group.

Personal life
Captain Sensible was previously in a long term relationship with Rachel Bor of Dolly Mixture. The couple have three children together. He is currently married to Mayumi.

Burns adopted his stage name Captain Sensible ironically because he used to be a "debauched maniac" who had fun "regardless of the consequences." However, after living at Dial House (the commune where the anarcho-punk band Crass lived) for a week to record an EP in 1981, his life changed and he became a vegetarian who adhered to Crass' pacifist and creative aims. Captain Sensible has written several songs about animal rights, including "Torture Me" and most notably the 1985 single "Wot! No Meat?".

Discography

Solo
Albums
Women and Captains First (1982), A&M – UK No. 64
The Power of Love (1983), A&M
Revolution Now (1989), Deltic
The Universe of Geoffrey Brown (1993), Humbug
Live at the Milky Way (1994), Humbug
Meathead (1995), Humbug
Mad Cows and Englishmen (1996), Scratch

Compilations
Sensible Singles (1984), A&M
A Day in the Life of ... (1984), A&M 
A Slice of Captain Sensible (1997), Humbug
The Captain's Box (1997), Humbug – [contains A Slice of Captain Sensible and Meathead]
Sensible Lifestyles: The Best of Captain Sensible (1997), Cleopatra
The Masters (1998), Eagle [reissue of Mad Cows and Englishmen, including bonus tracks]
The Collection (2003), Spectrum Music

EPs
This Is Your Captain Speaking (1981), Crass – UK Indie No. 3 
The Universe of Captain Sensible (1998), Jarmusic [contains 5 tracks from Revolution Now and The Universe of Geoffrey Brown]

Singles

Notes

The Damned

Damned Damned Damned (1977)
Music for Pleasure (1977)
Machine Gun Etiquette (1979)
The Black Album (1980)
Strawberries (1982)
Grave Disorder (2001)
So, Who's Paranoid? (2008)
Evil Spirits (2018)

Dead Men Walking
Live At CBGB New York City (2005), Resistance
Graveyard Smashes Volume 1 (2006), Resistance 
Easy Piracy (2015), Slimstyle Records

The Sensible Grey Cells
A Postcard from Britain (2013), Easy Action
Get Back into the World (2020), Damaged Goods

The Jack Tars
The Jack Tars EP (2015)

References

External links
 
 
 
 Interview with Captain Sensible (includes video of interview, and of The Damned's 35th anniversary tour), Rocker Magazine, 2011.
 Captain Sensible discography
 Extended discography

1954 births
People from Balham
Living people
The Damned (band) members
English punk rock singers
English punk rock guitarists
English punk rock bass guitarists
English male singers
English new wave musicians
Musicians from Brighton and Hove
Psychedelic rock musicians
Male bass guitarists
Male new wave singers
Dead Men Walking members
A&M Records artists
Anti–Iraq_War_activists
English republicans